The 1974 Open Championship was the 103rd Open Championship, held from 10–13 July at Royal Lytham & St Annes Golf Club in Lancashire, England. Gary Player won his third Open Championship, four strokes ahead of runner-up Peter Oosterhuis. It was the eighth of his nine major titles and second of the year; he won the Masters in April. In the other two majors in 1974, the U.S. Open and the PGA Championship, Player had top ten finishes.

The use of the larger "American ball" (diameter ) was made compulsory. In previous Opens, players could use the smaller "British ball".

Course layout

Source:Previous lengths of the course for The Open Championship (since 1950):
 1969:  
 1963: 
 1958:    
 1952:

Past champions in the field

Made both cuts

Missed the second cut

Missed the first cut

Round summaries

First round
Wednesday, 10 July 1974

Source:

Second round
Thursday, 11 July 1974

Amateurs: Lyle (+10), James (+16), Clark (+21), Burch (+22), Homer (+23), Shaw (+31).

Third round
Friday, 12 July 1974

Source:
Amateurs: Lyle (+23), James (+24).

Final round
Saturday, 13 July 1974

Source:

References

External links
Royal Lytham & St Annes 1974 (Official site)
103rd Open Championship - Royal Lytham & St Annes (European Tour)

The Open Championship
Golf tournaments in England
Open Championship
Open Championship
Open Championship